Tunisia, officially the Tunisian Republic, though often called the Republic of Tunisia in English, is the smallest country in North Africa by land area. Tunisia is in the process of economic reform and liberalization after decades of heavy state direction and participation in the economy. Prudent economic and fiscal planning have resulted in moderate but sustained growth for over a decade. Tunisia's economic growth historically has depended on oil, phosphates, agri-food products, car parts manufacturing, and tourism.  In the World Economic Forum 2008/2009 Global Competitiveness Report, the country ranks first in Africa and 36th globally for economic competitiveness, well ahead of Portugal (43), Italy (49) and Greece (67). With a GDP (PPP) per capita of $9795 Tunisia is among the wealthiest countries in Africa. Based on HDI, Tunisia ranks 5th in Africa.

Notable firms 
This list includes notable companies with primary headquarters located in the country. The industry and sector follow the Industry Classification Benchmark taxonomy. Organizations which have ceased operations are included and noted as defunct.

See also 
 Economy of Tunisia
 List of airlines of Tunisia
 List of banks in Tunisia

References

External links 
 

Companies of Tunisia
 
Tunisia